Vittorino Mansi  (died 3 April 1611) was a Roman Catholic prelate who served as Bishop of Ariano (1602–1611) and Bishop of Castellammare di Stabia (1599–1600).

Biography
Vittorino Mansi was ordained a priest in the Order of Saint Benedict.
On 1 February 1599, he was appointed during the papacy of Pope Clement VIII as Bishop of Castellammare di Stabia.
On 7 February 1599, he was consecrated bishop by Ottavio Paravicini, Cardinal-Priest of Santi Bonifacio ed Alessio, with Properzio Resta, Bishop of Cariati e Cerenzia, and Alessandro de Franceschi, Bishop Emeritus of Forlì, serving as co-consecrators. 
On 31 July 1600, he was appointed during the papacy of Pope Clement VIII as Coadjutor Bishop of Ariano.

On 20 December 1602, he succeeded to the bishopric.
He served as Bishop of Ariano until his death on 3 April 1611.

References

External links 
 (for Chronology of Bishops) 
 (for Chronology of Bishops) 
 (for Chronology of Bishops) 
 (for Chronology of Bishops) 

17th-century Italian Roman Catholic bishops
Bishops appointed by Pope Clement VIII
Bishops of Ariano
1611 deaths
Benedictine bishops